RS Puram (or "Rathina Sabapathi Puram") is an upper-class residential area in Coimbatore city in the state of Tamil Nadu, India. It is named after Dewan Bahadur C. S. Ratnasabhapathy Mudaliar, often considered as the founder of Modern Coimbatore.
R.S Puram consists of a mixture of commercial and residential buildings. Many multi-national commercial establishments, important government offices, sprawling educational institutions, shopping complexes, sporting facilities, tourist spots, restaurants, and cultural centers are located in the neighborhood. R.S Puram is also a prime residential area in Coimbatore.

Geography

RS Puram is situated in the western part of the city near Old Coimbatore area of Ukkadam and Poomarket between Mettupalayam Road and Thadagam Road.  RS Puram shares a border with: Sai Baba colony, Sukrawarpettai, Gandhi Park, Mettupalayam Road, Tamil Nadu Agri University Campus(TNAU), Forest Campus and Thadagam Road.

Population

RS Puram has an approximate population of 62,600.  Most local new generation companies including IT and mobile operate their head offices in the neighborhood, meaning RS Puram has a significant floating population.

Climate

RS Puram is located in Tamil Nadu, which has a mainly tropical savanna climate.   The highest temperature recorded there is 41 °C and the lowest is 12 °C.

Economy
Many rich commercial properties of the city are situated at RS Puram. As of now RS Puram is the third largest commercial hub of the Coimbatore City after Town Hall and Gandhipuram, Coimbatore. RS Puram has a large number of multinational chains and is one of the major shopping centres in Coimbatore.

Infrastructure

Design

RS Puram is a planned neighborhood. Diwan Bahadur Road is the largest road in the area. All roads running east-west cross DB Road and exit to Mettupalayam Road on the east and Thadagam Road on the west.

Localities
Localities of RS Puram include

 Diwan Bahadur Road (DB Road) -Main road
 TV Swamy Road (Thiruvenkata Swamy Road)-Main road
 Cowley Brown Road (Lawley Road)-Main road (Cowley Brown was first Principal of Forest Campus and Lawley was first Principal and Founder of Agricultural University)
 Ponnurangam Road (West and East)
 Venkatasamy Road (West and East)
 Sir Shanmugam Road
 Sirinivasa ragavan street
 Periaswamy Road (West and East)
 Bashyakarlu Road (West and East)
 Lokamanya Street (West and East)
 Sambandam Road (West and East)
 VenkataRamana Road
 Arokiyasamy Road
 Azad Road
 Ramalingam Road
 Arunachalam Street
 Robertson Road
 Siva Subramaniam Road
Father Randy Street (North, South, East, and West)

In January, 2018, RS Puram Police Station was judged the best police station in India by the Home Ministry, Government of India.

Gallery

References

:Neighbourhoods in Coimbatore
Neighbourhoods in Coimbatore
Shopping districts and streets in India